Usman Baba Pategi, known mostly as Samanja Mazan Fama (born 20 May, 1942) is a retired Nigerian Army. Together with Yusuf Ladan, Mamman Ladan and Idi Jibril an NTA staff introduced the Hausa comedy known now as Kannywood, Northern Nigerian films or Hausa films in 80s to the Northern audience.

Biography 
Pategi was born on May 20, 1942, into the royal house of Pategi Emirate in Pategi, Northern Nigeria. He is the son of Etsu Usman Patako late King of Pategi. He started his early education in Pategi primary school and then went to Ilorin Middle School. Then later on he went to Kaduna to live with his uncle Alhaji Audu Bida which he became his assistance at home. He also worked with public works department in the mechanical store, before  joining Northern Broadcasting Corporation, (NBC) in Kaduna.

He joined the Nigeria Army in 60s where an Army captain during the Nigerian civil war came looking for youth in Northern Nigeria to volunteer, he left the Broadcasting cooperation to join the army and  trained at the Signal Training School, Apapa, he served under General Sani Abacha and  General Sani Sami. Later he retired in 1985 and went on for acting career drama at the FRCN Kaduna which he also direct and writes movies, mostly he was known as Samanja Maza Fama, the word meaning Sergeant-Major (SerMajor) due to the experience he got in his army career.

In 2010, he was in India for a surgery of a heart illness which later N1.5 million was given by the Chairman Dangote Group, Alhaji Aliko Dangote, which it was reported by the Federal Radio Corporation of Nigeria (FRCN).

Pategi is one among the notable Nigerian actor known as (Samanja) and Chika Apala known as (Zebrudaya) mostly in the movies industries and where guest honours at the dinner of art theatre in the National Association of Nigerian Theatre Arts Practitioners (NANTAP).

The acting career 
Pategi who was born into the royalty house of an emirate, was also the heir to the Etsu Pategi Emirate, but pursued his dreaming career; acting after reported being the main candidate for his father and great grandfather throne as Etsu Pategi, a Nupe town in now Kwara state his father was the Etsu Usman Patako, the king of Pategi and also his grand father was a king which later his father succeeded him after death, he scarified and declined to be Etsu Pategi (King of Pategi) because of the career he aim to be, he left the throne for his little brother Etsu Umaru Chatta who died in 2017 and was succeeded by Umaru Bologi. He mostly appears as a police or soldier in their common practice and dramatize moves in the movie industry, when asked he said due to the experience he got in as army, I decided to use the way they react, moves and commands  that's where the name (Samanja) came on, the way Sergeant and Major due control and commands the order ranks and stated that acting gives him more joy and happiness that's why retired and returned to his acting career. He mostly performed in the Army Day Celebration, even the one as General Ibrahim Babangida in Lagos and Aso Rock Presidential Villa, Abuja and that of Maryam Abacha.

The popular actor, writer and director starred in the populous Hausa film known as:
 Samanja
 Yusuf's Ladan's
 Zaman Duniya Iyawa Ne

Pategi got popularity on the movie Samanja in the likes of mixing Hausa/English and pidgin English they way Nigeria soldiers usually speaks.

Baba Pategi has three wife and 20 children. He lost one among his wife Hajiya Maryam Baba at her age 46.

References 

1942 births
Living people
Nigerian male film actors
Nigerian film directors
Kannywood actors
Male actors in Hausa cinema
20th-century Nigerian male actors
People from Kwara State